The 1936 Tour de France was the 30th edition of the Tour de France, one of cycling's Grand Tours. The Tour began in Paris with a flat stage on 7 July, and Stage 14a occurred on 23 July with a flat stage from Montpellier. The race finished in Paris on 2 August.

Stage 14a
23 July 1936 – Montpellier to Narbonne,

Stage 14b
23 July 1936 – Narbonne to Perpignan,  (ITT)

Rest day 4
24 July 1936 – Perpignan

Stage 15
25 July 1936 – Perpignan to Luchon,

Rest day 5
26 July 1936 – Luchon

Stage 16
27 July 1936 – Luchon to Pau,

Rest day 6
28 July 1936 – Pau

Stage 17
29 July 1936 – Pau to Bordeaux,

Stage 18a
30 July 1936 – Bordeaux to Saintes,

Stage 18b
30 July 1936 – Saintes to La Rochelle,  (ITT)

Stage 19a
31 July 1936 – La Rochelle to La Roche-sur-Yon,

Stage 19b
31 July 1936 – La Roche-sur-Yon to Cholet,  (ITT)

Stage 19c
31 July 1936 – Cholet to Angers,  (ITT)

Stage 20a
1 August 1936 – Angers to Vire,

Stage 20b
1 August 1936 – Vire to Caen,  (ITT)

Stage 21
2 August 1936 – Caen to Paris,

References

1936 Tour de France
Tour de France stages